Lilien is a surname. Notable people with the surname include:

Ephraim Moses Lilien (1874–1925), American art nouveau illustrator and printmaker 
Gary Lilien, American management professor
Kurt Lilien (1882–1943), German actor
Marya Lilien (1900 or 1901–1998), Polish architect